Stuffed crust pizza is pizza with cheese (typically mozzarella) or other ingredients added into the outer edge of the crust. The stuffed crust pizza was popularized by Pizza Hut, which debuted this style of pizza in 1995.

History

Pizza Hut introduced stuffed crust pizza, created by Patty Scheibmeir, and launched it on March 25, 1995. It was marketed in a commercial with Donald Trump.

Pizza Hut was sued by the family of Anthony Mongiello for $1 billion, over claims that Pizza Hut's stuffed crust infringed on Mongiello's 1987 patent (US4661361A) on making stuffed pizza shells. Pizza Hut was found to have not infringed on the Patent in 1999, the court stating "...[the] plaintiff does not have a product patent, and its method patent is not infringed simply because some examples of defendant's completed product approximate plaintiff's product.".

DiGiorno began offering a cheese stuffed crust pizza in grocery stores in 2001.

In 2012, Pizza Hut launched hot dog stuffed crust pizza in Japan, China, and South Korea, followed by Australia, Canada, the U.K., and the U.S. Domino's also sold a hot dog stuffed crust pizza in the U.S., U.K., and New Zealand.

Pizza Hut New Zealand has sold Marmite stuffed crust pizza, and Pizza Hut Japan introduced a pizza with a crust of pockets stuffed with, alternately, Camembert, shrimp, sausage, and mozzarella. Pizza Hut Japan offered a crust stuffed with shrimp and mayonnaise, and Pizza Hut Germany offered a "German King" with a sausage, bacon, and cheese-stuffed crust. Pizza Hut Japan and South Korea have sold pizza with shrimp and cheese-stuffed crust, and Pizza Hut Hong Kong made abalone sauce "Cheesy Lava"-stuffed crust pizza. Pizza Hut Australia made a pizza with a crust stuffed with miniature meat pies. In 2020, Papa John's released its own cheese-filled stuffed crust pizza.

See also

 Pizza in the United States
 Pan pizza
 List of tomato dishes

References

Tomato dishes
Pizza styles